

Track listing 

 Tres Corazones
 Cantinero
 La Voz
 Noches de Ilusión
 Dale Gracias al Señor
 El Hombre Lobo
 Pavo Real
 Costumbres de Mi Tierra

References 

Joe Arroyo albums
Sony Music Colombia albums
1997 albums